Formaldoxime is the organic compound with the formula H2C=NOH.  It is the oxime of formaldehyde.  A colorless liquid, the pure compound tends to polymerize into a trimer.  Aqueous solutions are stable as is the hydrochloride. It is a reagent in organic synthesis for the conversion of aryl diazonium salts to aryl aldehydes.

It is generated by combining hydroxylamine and formaldehyde.

References

Aldoximes